Keisai Eisen (渓斎 英泉, 1790–1848) was a Japanese ukiyo-e artist who specialised in bijin-ga (pictures of beautiful women). His best works, including his ōkubi-e ("large head pictures"), are considered to be masterpieces of the "decadent" Bunsei Era (1818–1830). He was also known as Ikeda Eisen, and wrote under the name of Ippitsuan.

Biography
Eisen was born in Edo into the Ikeda family, the son of a noted calligrapher. He was apprenticed to Kanō Hakkeisai, from whom he took the name Keisai, and after the death of his father he studied under Kikugawa Eizan. His initial works reflected the influence of his mentor, but he soon developed his own style.

He produced a number of surimono (prints that were privately issued), erotic prints, and landscapes, including The Sixty-nine Stations of the Kiso Kaidō, which he started and which was completed by Hiroshige. Eisen is most renowned for his bijin-ga (pictures of beautiful women) which portrayed the subjects as more worldly than those depicted by earlier artists, replacing their grace and elegance with a less studied sensuality. He produced many portraits and full-length studies depicting the fashions of the time.

In addition to producing a prolific number of prints, he was a writer, producing biographies of the Forty-seven Ronin and several books, including a continuation of the Ukiyo-e Ruiko (History of Prints of the Floating World), a book which documented the lives of the ukiyo-e artists. His supplement is known as "Notes of a Nameless Old Man." He describes himself as a dissolute hard-drinker and claims to have been the owner of a brothel in Nezu in the 1830s which had burned down.

Gallery

External links
Keisai Eisen by Honolulu Museum of Art

References

 Rasch, Carsten: Keisai Eisen, Berlin 2015.

1790 births
1848 deaths
Ukiyo-e artists